Ho Chung Chung MBE JP (1906-1979) was an educator in Hong Kong. She was the principal of the True Light Middle School of Hong Kong from 1946 to 1974. She was awarded an honorary doctorate of humane letters from the Western College for Women, Ohio, in 1959 and an honorary D.Litt. from the University of Hong Kong in 1975. She was appointed MBE in the 1955 New Year Honours.

References

1906 births
1979 deaths
Heads of schools in Hong Kong
20th-century Hong Kong women